Fort Laramie is a CBS Radio Western series starring Raymond Burr as Captain Lee Quince. It aired Sunday afternoons January 22–October 28, 1956, at 5:30 pm ET.
Produced and directed by Norman Macdonnell, this Western drama depicted life at old Fort Laramie during the 19th Century. The 41 episodes starred Raymond Burr as Lee Quince, captain of the cavalry. One year later, Burr became a television star as Perry Mason.

In the series, the fort had 400 troops in all but they had to keep their eye on a nearby Indian reservation with 4,000 Sioux camped there. Major Ned Daggart led the troops and he didn't always see eye to eye with Quince. Daggart had a niece called Terrie Lawson, who had her eye on the Captain.

Supporting regulars included Vic Perrin as Sgt. Gorse, Harry Bartell as the slightly green Lt. Seiberts and Jack Moyles as Major Daggett. Heard on a more irregular basis were Howard McNear as Pliny the fort sutler, Sam Edwards as Trooper Harrison, and in a variety of roles, such actors as John Dehner, John McIntire, Virginia Gregg, James Nusser, Parley Baer and Barney Phillips. Amerigo Marino supplied the music. The scripts were mostly written by John Meston, Kathleen Hite, Les Crutchfield and John Dunkel.

John Dehner originally auditioned for the part of Lee Quince in a story that was later remade with Burr in the lead, called "The Boatwright's Story".

References

External links
Jerry Haendiges Vintage Radio Logs: Fort Laramie

American radio dramas
Western (genre) radio series
1956 radio programme debuts
1956 radio programme endings
1950s American radio programs
CBS Radio programs